Edward Herle (c. 1617 – 20 April 1695) was an English politician who sat in the House of Commons  at various times between 1640 and 1689. He fought in the Parliamentary army in the English Civil War.

Herle was the son of Thomas Herle of Prideaux, Cornwall, and his wife Lowday Glyn, daughter of Nicholas Glyn of Glyn, Cornwall and brother of Thomas Herle, M.P.

In April 1640, Herle was elected Member of Parliament for Bossiney in the Short Parliament. 

Herle raised a Troop of Horse, at his own expense at the start of the Civil War and commanded them throughout. He was appointed High Sheriff of Cornwall in 1646 and in 1647 was appointed Vice-Admiral of the Coast for North Cornwall. 

In 1659 Herle was elected MP  for Fowey in the Third Protectorate Parliament. In April 1660 he was elected MP for Callington and Fowey  in the  Convention Parliament and chose to sit for Fowey. He was elected MP for 
Grampound in 1689.

He died in 1695 and was buried at Luxulyan, Cornwall. He married twice; firstly Mary, daughter and coheiress of Nicholas Trefusis of Lezant,  with whom he had seven sons and three daughters and secondly Susanna, the widow of John Owen, a London fishmonger.

References

 

1617 births
1695 deaths
Members of the pre-1707 English Parliament for constituencies in Cornwall
Roundheads
High Sheriffs of Cornwall
English MPs 1640 (April)
English MPs 1659
English MPs 1660
English MPs 1689–1690